Rashawn Slater  (born March 26, 1999) is an American football offensive tackle for the Los Angeles Chargers of the National Football League (NFL). He played college football at Northwestern and was drafted by the Chargers in the first round of the 2021 NFL Draft.

Early life and high school
Slater grew up in Sugar Land, Texas and attended Fort Settlement Middle School and Clements High School. He was named first team All-District as a junior and senior, when he was also named second team All-Greater Houston. Slater was rated a three star recruit and committed to play college football at Northwestern over offers from Illinois, Kansas, Wyoming and Rice.

College career
As a true freshman, Slater started 12 games at right tackle and was named Big Ten Conference All-Freshman Team. He was rated the best freshman offensive lineman in the nation by Pro Football Focus. As a sophomore, Slater was named to the third team All-Big Ten by the league's coaches after starting all 14 of Northwestern's games. Slater was named honorable mention All-Big Ten after allowing zero sacks in 11 starts as a junior.

Entering his senior year, Slater was named a preseason All-American, preseason All-Big Ten and to the Outland Trophy watchlist. Following the early announcement that Big Ten would postpone their 2020 season due to the COVID-19 pandemic, Slater announced that he would be preparing for the 2021 NFL Draft. He remained enrolled at Northwestern and graduated with a degree in communications in December 2020.

Professional career

Slater was selected by the Los Angeles Chargers in the first round (13th overall) of the 2021 NFL Draft. He signed his four-year rookie contract on July 27, 2021.

As a rookie, Slater was named the Chargers starting left tackle and was named to his first Pro Bowl as a starter.

Against the Jacksonville Jaguars in Week 3 of the 2022 season, Slater ruptured his biceps tendon, which ended his season.

Personal life
Slater is the son of former NBA player Reggie Slater. His older brother, RJ, was an offensive lineman for the United States Air Force Academy from 2014-2017.

He is married to Stassney Nicole Brown.

References

External links 
Los Angeles Chargers bio
Northwestern Wildcats bio

Living people
American football offensive tackles
Players of American football from Texas
Sportspeople from the Houston metropolitan area
Northwestern Wildcats football players
People from Sugar Land, Texas
1999 births
Los Angeles Chargers players
African-American players of American football
21st-century African-American sportspeople
American Conference Pro Bowl players